Carlos Alberto Marrero Cabrera (born 1 October 1914, date of death unknown) was a Venezuelan sports shooter. He competed in the 50 m pistol event at the 1952 Summer Olympics.

References

External links
 

1914 births
Year of death missing
Place of birth missing
Venezuelan male sport shooters
Olympic shooters of Venezuela
Shooters at the 1952 Summer Olympics
Pan American Games bronze medalists for Venezuela
Pan American Games medalists in shooting
Shooters at the 1955 Pan American Games